Rémy Zaugg (January 11, 1943 – August 23, 2005) was a Swiss painter, primarily known as a conceptual artist. He played an important role as both a critic and observer of contemporary culture, especially with regards to the perception of space and architecture.

Life
Rémy Zaugg was born in 1943 in Courgenay, Jura, Switzerland. After attending high school in Porrentruy, he attended the Basel School of Art. In 1971 he received the "Eidgenössisches Kunststipendium" (now the Eidgenössische Preis für freie Kunst), a Swiss arts prize for young artists. Zaugg lived and worked in Basel, Switzerland, and Pfastatt, France.

Primarily using text and the meaning of the word as the subject of his paintings, Zaugg dealt with themes of perception, examining the various facets of vision. He believed sight and consciousness to be effectively linked, and that it was through their overlapping that our relationship with the world develops. He created paintings, works on paper, public sculpture, urban analysis and architectural designs. His theoretical discussions, in particular the book Das Kunstmuseum, das ich mir erträume. Oder Der Ort des Werkes und des Menschen (The Art Museum of My Dreams. Or the Place for Work and People) (1987), are important texts for art historians and artists. Throughout his life Zaugg questioned everything which the surrounding world took for granted, garnering talk of a "philosopher-artist." In 1990 he received the Kunstpreis der Stadt Basel (Art Prize of the City of Basel).

In recent years interesting collaborations with the architects Herzog & de Meuron, found international praise, with around 15 projects realised. These projects included an extension to the Aargauer Kunsthaus in Aarau, and Zaugg's own studio, "Studio Rémy Zaugg" in Mulhouse-Pfastatt, France, with the latter included at the awards ceremony of the Pritzker Prize, which Herzog & de Meuron received in 2001. The studio functioned both as Zaugg's workplace and exhibition hall. In designing a space suitable for exhibition, Herzog & de Meuron were given the opportunity to experiment with the concept of overhead lighting, the outcome of which went on to influence their design for the Tate Modern gallery in London.

In the last years of his life Zaugg was involved in the New Patrons program headed by Xavier Douroux. In collaboration with Douroux and the local inhabitants of Blessey, a small village near Dijon, he created an La Lavoir de Blessey - an open-space artwork near the village's restored washhouse.

Zaugg was a renowned curator, organising shows such as the comprehensive Alberto Giacometti retrospective held in Paris 1991. In 1995, he made a contribution to the Swiss art and literary periodical TROU Nr. IX.

Zaugg died in 2005 in Basel.

Exhibitions
1972 Dedans-Dehors, Kunstmuseum Basel
1977 Biennale de Paris
1982 Documenta 7, Kassel
1984 A Sheet of Paper, Stedelijk Van Abbemuseum, Eindhoven
1988 Für ein Bild, Kunsthalle Basel
1989 Ein Blatt Papier, perzeptive Skizzen, oder die Entstehung eines Bildwerks, Werke von 1973–1989, Museum Folkwang, Essen
1990 Une feuille de papier, Musée d'art contemporain de Lyon
1990 Biennale, Sydney
1991 Alberto Giacometti, Musée d'Art Moderne de la Ville de Paris
1992 Rémy Zaugg, Le Consortium Dijon
1993 Draußen, Gesellschaft für Aktuelle Kunst, Bremen
1994 Tableau Aveugles 1986–1991, Modulo, Lissabon
1995 Herzog & de Meuron, Centre Georges Pompidou, Paris
1996 Malerei 1973–1994, Barbara Gross Galerie, München
1997 Rémy Zaugg, RETROSPEKTIVE, Ein Fragment, Kunsthalle Nürnberg
1997 Public Works, Van Abbemuseum, Eindhoven
1998 Le Monde dit, Die Welt spricht, Gesamtkunstwerk im Eidgenössischen Verwaltungsgebäude, Bern
1999 Ich, ich, sehe., Barbara Gross Galerie, München
1999 Rémy Zaugg, Schau, du bist blind, schau, Kunsthalle Basel
1999 Das XX. Jahrhundert – ein Jahrhundert Kunst in Deutschland, National Galerie, Berlin
2000 Über den Tod, Kunsthalle, Bern
2000 Sinn und Sinnlichkeit – Körper + Geist im Bild, Neues Museum Weserburg Bremen
2001 Architecture by Herzog & de Meuron, wall painting by Rémy Zaugg, a work for Roche Basel
2001 Abbild. Recent Portraiture and Depiction, Steirischer Herbst, Graz
2001 Nauman, Felix Gonzalez Torres und Zaugg im Magasin 3, Stockholm
2002 About death II, Art Unlimited, Art 33, Basel
2002 Nouvelle simplicité – art „construit“ et architecture suisse contemporaine, Espace de l’Art Concret im Château de Mouans, Mouans-Sartoux
2002 French Collection – rien ne presse / slow and steady / festina lente / deuxième épisode, Musée d’art moderne et contemporain, Genf
2002 IMAGINE, YOU ARE STANDING HERE IN FRONT OF ME, Caldic Collection, Museum Boijmans Van Beuningen, Rotterdam
2002 Les années 70 : l’art en cause im CAPC Musée d’Art Contemporain, Entrepôt, Bordeaux
2003 Warum!, Martin Gropius-Bau, Berlin
2003 Talking Pieces – Text und Bild in der Zeitgenössischen Kunst, Städtisches Museum Leverkusen Schloß Morsbroich, Leverkusen
2003 On Kawara: Consciousness, meditation, watcher on the hill, 2002 – Rémy Zaugg: De la mort II, 
1999-2002, Le Consortium, Dijon
2003 Rémy Zaugg Works 1963-2003, Galerie Mai 36, Zürich
2004 Barbara Gross Galerie, München
2004 A-Z, Brooke Alexander Gallery, New York
2004 White Spirit, Frac Lorraine, Metz
2005 Kevin Brown: A man and his mayonnaise, Brooke Alexander Gallery, New York

References
This article was initially translated from the German Wikipedia.

1943 births
2005 deaths
20th-century Swiss painters
Swiss male painters
21st-century Swiss painters
21st-century Swiss male artists
Swiss contemporary artists
20th-century Swiss male artists